A royal mantle, or more simply a mantle, is a garment normally worn by emperors, kings or queens as a symbol of authority. When worn at a coronation, such mantles may be referred to as coronation mantles. Many princes also wear such a mantle. Sometimes the mantles are worn only once, but in other instances they may be worn or used on other occasions, such as during the opening of a session of the nation's legislature. Mantles also feature prominently in state portraiture and artwork featuring monarchs and princes.

In principle, there is no difference between the mantles of an emperor and king. Different countries have their own styles, and the shape of mantles has changed somewhat over the centuries. The oldest coats were not very long, and they were not lined with fur. In the 18th century, cloaks become more like each other and appeared everywhere in Europe. The French example was lined with fur, and a cloak with a long train became standard. Only the German emperors continued their short coat from the 12th century to the end of their empire.

The non-crowned but inaugurated Dutch kings wear a robe on the French model. In the Netherlands, one does not speak of a coronation mantle but uses the term "royal robe" (Dutch phonetic: γoningsmant∂l).

Gallery

Bibliography 
 Ruess, K.H. (red.), Becker, H-J. et al. (1997): Die Reichskleinodien, Herrschaftszeichen des Heiligen Römischen Reiches, Gesellschaft für Staufische Geschichte, Göppingen, 
 Elzinga, E. (1990): Theater van staat: oude tradities rond een jong koningschap, Rijksmuseum Paleis Het Loo, Apeldoorn
 Fasseur, C. (1998): Wilhelmina, de jonge koningin, Balans, Amsterdam
 Fillitz, H. (1954): Die Insignien und Kleinodien des Heiligen Römischen Reiches, Schroll, Wenen - München
 Grijpma, Dieuwke (1999): Kleren voor de elite. Nederlandse couturiers en hun klanten 1882-2000, Balans, Amsterdam, 
 Kubin, E. (1991): Die Reichskleinodien, Ihr tausendjähriger Weg, Wenen - München, 
 Seipel, H.W. (2004): Nobiles Officinae. Die königlichen Hofwerkstätten zu Palermo zur Zeit der Normannen und Staufer im 12. und 13. Jahrhundert, Skira, Milaan,

See also 
Koningsmantel (Netherlands)
Swedish coronation robes
Mantle of Luís I
Mantle of João VI
Robe
Blessed Mantle of the Prophet Muhammad

External links 
 The Austrian royal mantle
 H. Abraham, The coronation vestments, www.viennatouristguide.at (2003).
 De Noorse kroningsmantels

Fur
Heraldry
Coats (clothing)
Robes and cloaks